Extrasolar PlanetsEncyclopaediadata

Kepler-22 is a sun-like star in the northern constellation of Cygnus, the swan, that is orbited by a planet found to be unequivocally within the star's habitable zone. It is located at the celestial coordinates: Right Ascension , Declination . With an apparent visual magnitude of 11.7, this star is too faint to be seen with the naked eye. It can be viewed with a telescope having an aperture of at least .



Stellar characteristics
Kepler-22 is slightly smaller and cooler than the Sun, with a lower abundance of elements having more mass than helium. It has a spectral type of G5V, while the luminosity class remains undetermined. This star is radiating 79% of the Sun's luminosity from its outer atmosphere at an effective temperature of 5,518 K, giving it the yellow-hued glow of a G-type star. A projected rotational velocity of 0.6 km/s suggests it has a long period of rotation. No flare activity has been detected.

Planetary system

On December 5, 2011, scientists from the Kepler mission announced that a possible Earth-like world (Kepler-22b) had been discovered orbiting in the star's habitable zone by NASA's Kepler spacecraft.  This was significant in that it was the first relatively Earth-sized exoplanet (2.4 times as big) confirmed to be orbiting within a star's habitable zone.

References

 
G-type main-sequence stars
87
Planetary transit variables
Cygnus (constellation)
Planetary systems with one confirmed planet
J19165219+4753040
TIC objects